Tareq Abdulaziz (born May 14, 1991) is a Saudi Arabian professional footballer who plays for Al-Tuhami as a defender. He played for Al-Fayha during 2016–17 season, where he helped them win the title and promotion to the Pro League, before being released on June 15, 2017.

Honours
Al-Fayha
Saudi First Division: 2016–17

References

External links 
 

1991 births
Living people
Saudi Arabian footballers
Al-Wehda Club (Mecca) players
Al-Fayha FC players
Al-Kawkab FC players
Al-Arabi SC (Saudi Arabia) players
Al-Entesar Club players
Al Tuhami Club players
Saudi First Division League players
Saudi Professional League players
Saudi Second Division players
Saudi Third Division players
Association football defenders